Michel Demoulin (born 19 June 1965) is a Belgian sports shooter. He competed in the mixed skeet event at the 1988 Summer Olympics.

References

External links
 

1965 births
Living people
Belgian male sport shooters
Olympic shooters of Belgium
Shooters at the 1988 Summer Olympics
People from Uccle
Sportspeople from Brussels